Gunadal is a panchayat village in the state of Karnataka, India. Administratively it is under Bijapur Taluka of Bijapur district, Karnataka. Located in the far southwestern corner of the district, Gunadal is nearly 45 km by road from the district headquarters, the city of Bijapur. In Gunadal there is a Government Ayurvedic Hospital, Government Veterinary Hospital, Post Office, Police Station and gram panchayat headquarters.

There are four villages in the Gunadal gram panchayat: Gunadal, Babalad, Kengalagutti and Shirabur.

Demographics
In the 2001 Indian census, the village of Gunadal had a population of 2,136, with 1,131 males and 1,005 females.

In the 2011 census, the village of Gunadal had a population of 2,711.

Temples

Shri Pandurang Temple
Shri Kalika Devi Temple
Shri AmoghaSiddeshwar Temple
Shri Durga Devi Temple
Shri Basaveshwar Temple
Shri Venkateshwar Temple
Shri Mallikarjun Temple

Agriculture
The village land is quite fertile, with over 90% of it being well-suited to cultivation and crop production. Farmers there grow mainly sugar cane, grapes, maize, and sorghum. Small areas are planted in citrus orchards, and crops such as onions and turmeric. Irrigation is mainly based upon distribution canals from the river, borewells and open wells.

Education

The Govt Higher Primary School has currently working with 1st to 7th standard having more than 250 students and the Indira Gandi Memorial New High School is working with 8th to 10th Standards having more than 200 students. The whole village has a higher than 75% literacy rate.

Festivals

The main celebrations of the year are Shri Hari Pandurang Vittal Saptaha (Dindhi) and Khaza Yamanur Uras. Kara Hunnume, Nagara Panchami, Deepavli, Ugadi, and Dassara are also celebrated.

References

External links
 
 Gundal on 

Villages in Bijapur district, Karnataka